Following is a list of notable actors and actresses from Broadway musicals:

A

 F. Murray Abraham  
 Edie Adams
 Nick Adams
 Uzo Aduba
 Anna Maria Alberghetti
 Eddie Albert
 Jack Albertson  
 Alan Alda
 Robert Alda
 Tom Aldredge
 Graham Alexander
 Jason Alexander
 Debbie Allen
 Elizabeth Allen
 Fred Allen
 Jonelle Allen
 Rae Allen
 Sasha Allen
 June Allyson
 Christy Altomare
 Don Ameche
 Christine Andreas
 Julie Andrews
 Marc Anthony
 Christina Applegate
 Sebastian Arcelus
 Eve Arden
 Michael Arden
 Adam Arkin
 Desi Arnaz
 Lucie Arnaz
 Bea Arthur
 Annaleigh Ashford
 Brooks Ashmanskas
 Adele Astaire
 Fred Astaire
 Skylar Astin
 Ashlie Atkinson
 René Auberjonois
 Hank Azaria
 Tony Azito

B

Ba–Bm

 Obba Babatundé
 Lauren Bacall
 Pearl Bailey
 Dylan Baker
 Josephine Baker
 Mark Baker
 Scott Bakula
 Kate Baldwin
 Lucille Ball
 Michael Ball
 Kaye Ballard
 Colleen Ballinger
 Christine Baranski 
 Adrienne Barbeau
Sara Bareilles
 Brent Barrett
 Barbara Barrie
 Fantasia Barrino
 John Barrowman 
 Gene Barry
 Roger Bart
 Peter Bartlett
 Rob Bartlett
 Lance Bass 
 Hinton Battle
 Anne Baxter
 Nora Bayes
 Gary Beach
 Shoshana Bean
 Laurie Beechman
 Harry Belafonte
 Bertha Belmore
 Laura Benanti
 William Bendix
 Jack Benny
 Melissa Benoist
 Jodi Benson
 Robby Benson
 Polly Bergen
 Milton Berle
 Herschel Bernardi
 Michael Berresse
 Ken Berry
 Sarah Uriarte Berry
 Isabel Bigley
 Theodore Bikel
 Alexandra Billings
 Vivian Blaine
 Tammy Blanchard
 Jules Bledsoe
 Corbin Bleu
 Heidi Blickenstaff
 Stephanie J. Block
 Eric Blore 
 Larry Blyden

Bn–Bz

 Walter Bobbie
 Alfie Boe 
 Stephen Bogardus
 Sierra Boggess
 Ray Bolger
 Sheila Bond
 Shirley Booth
 Irene Bordoni
 Christian Borle
 Philip Bosco 
 Tom Bosley
 Barry Bostwick
 Simon Bowman
 Phillip Boykin
 Eddie Bracken
 Toni Braxton
 Lisa Brescia
 Eileen Brennan
 Donald Brian
 Fanny Brice
 Beau Bridges
 Dee Dee Bridgewater
 Alex Brightman
 Sarah Brightman
 Helen Broderick 
 Matthew Broderick
 Geraldine Brooks
 Louise Brooks 
 Anne Brown
 Blair Brown
 Georgia Brown
 Jason Robert Brown 
 Johnny Brown
 Russ Brown
 Roscoe Lee Browne
 Susan Browning
 Carol Bruce
 Yul Brynner
 John W. Bubbles
 Jack Buchanan
 Betty Buckley
 Gregg Burge
 Tituss Burgess
 Laura Bell Bundy
 Billie Burke
 Delta Burke 
 Carol Burnett
 David Burns
 Karla Burns
 Raymond Burr 
 Danny Burstein
 Kate Burton
 Richard Burton
 Meg Bussert
 Kerry Butler
 Norbert Leo Butz

C

Ca–Cm

 Sid Caesar
 James Cagney
 L. Scott Caldwell
 Michael Callan
 Ann Hampton Callaway
 Liz Callaway
 Cab Calloway
 Eduardo Cansino, Sr.
 Mario Cantone 
 David Cantor
 Eddie Cantor
 Virginia Capers
 Irene Cara
 Len Cariou
 Kitty Carlisle
 Jeffrey Carlson
 Carolee Carmello
 Reeve Carney
 Carleton Carpenter
 Thelma Carpenter
 Diahann Carroll
 Pat Carroll
 Aaron Carter
 Dixie Carter
 Jack Carter
 Nell Carter
 Ralph Carter
 Emma Carus 
Sophia Anne Caruso
 Max Casella 
 Peggy Cass
 David Cassidy
 Jack Cassidy
 Patrick Cassidy
 Shaun Cassidy
 Roy Castle
 Vernon and Irene Castle
 Mary Jo Catlett 
 Matt Cavenaugh
 Jonathan Stuart Cerullo
 Michael Cerveris
 George Chakiris
 Richard Chamberlain
 Kevin Chamberlin
 Gower Champion
 Marge Champion
 Adam Chanler-Berat
 Carol Channing
 Stockard Channing
 Sydney Chaplin
 Cyd Charisse
 Will Chase
 Kristin Chenoweth
 Maurice Chevalier
 Sandra Church
 Wayne Cilento
 Ina Claire
 Petula Clark
 Victoria Clark
 Katie Rose Clarke
 Jan Clayton
 Lewis Cleale
 Glenn Close

Cn–Cz

 Imogene Coca
 James Coco
 Jennifer Cody
 George M. Cohan
 Patti Cohenour
 Charles Coles
 Toni Collette
 Dorothy Collins
 Jose Collins
 Betty Comden
 Bert Convy
 Jeff Conaway
 Shirl Conway
 Barbara Cook
 Carole Cook
 Chuck Cooper
 Marilyn Cooper
 Robert Coote
 Leanne Cope
 Nick Cordero
 Jesse Corti
 Noël Coward
 Deborah Cox 
 Veanne Cox
 Ben Crawford
 Michael Crawford
 Luther Creek
 Gavin Creel
 Darren Criss
 Anthony Crivello
 Ann Crumb
 Max Crumm
 Wilson Cruz
 John Cullum
 Alan Cumming
 Robert Cummings
 Michael Cumpsty
 Tim Curry
 Keene Curtis

D

 Stephanie D'Abruzzo
 Charlotte d'Amboise
 Jacques d'Amboise 
 Fifi D'Orsay
 Janet Dacal
 Dan Dailey
 Jim Dale
 Tyne Daly
 Jennifer Damiano
 Stuart Damon
 Lili Damita 
 Dorothy Dandridge 
 Merle Dandridge
 Jason Danieley
 Billy Daniels
 Blythe Danner
 Severn Darden
 Howard Da Silva
 Mara Davi
 John Davidson
 Erin Davie
 Marion Davies
 Bette Davis
 Clifton Davis
 Elizabeth A. Davis
 Frenchie Davis 
 Ossie Davis
 Sammy Davis, Jr.
 Rachel deBenedet
Ariana DeBose
 Yvonne De Carlo
 Billy De Wolfe 
 Diana DeGarmo
 Gloria DeHaven
 Robin de Jesús
 Lea DeLaria
 Judi Dench
 Cleavant Derricks
 Andre DeShields
 Gaby Deslys
 Loretta Devine
 Karla DeVito
 Chris Diamantopoulos
 Joan Diener
 Daveed Diggs
 Taye Diggs
 Phyllis Diller
 Denny Dillon
 Lee Dixon
 Marcie Dodd
 Dan Domenech
 Colman Domingo
 Stephen Douglass
 Bruce Dow
 Eddie Dowling
 Matt Doyle
 Alfred Drake
 Paul Draper
 Marie Dressler
 Laura Dreyfuss
 Haylie Duff
 Isadora Duncan
 Sandy Duncan
 Irene Dunne
 Christopher Durang
 Jimmy Durante
 Nancy Dussault
 Ronnie Dyson

E

 Daisy Eagan
 Sheena Easton 
 Christine Ebersole
 Buddy Ebsen
 Nelson Eddy
 Gregg Edelman
 Linda Eder
 Susan Egan
 Taina Elg
 Patricia Elliott
 Kerry Ellis
 Julian Eltinge
 Georgia Engel
 Cynthia Erivo
 Melissa Errico
 Leon Errol
 Raúl Esparza
 Michael Esper
 Eden Espinosa
 Ruth Etting
 Rob Evan
 Maurice Evans
 Rex Everhart

F

 Mary Faber
 Nanette Fabray
 Megan Fairchild
 Robert Fairchild
 Mike Faist
 Lola Falana
 Joey Fatone 
 Alice Faye
 Joey Faye 
 Michael Feinstein 
 Tovah Feldshuh
 Edith Fellows
 Jesse Tyler Ferguson
 José Ferrer
 W.C. Fields
 Harvey Fierstein
 Katie Finneran
 Carrie Fisher
 Christopher Fitzgerald
 Michael Flatley 
 Dan Fogler
 Santino Fontana
 Bob Fosse
 Hunter Foster
 Sutton Foster
 Beth Fowler
 Eddie Foy
 Eddie Foy Jr.
 Sergio Franchi
 Stacy Francis 
 Bonnie Franklin
 Hadley Fraser
 William Frawley
 Jonathan Freeman
 Morgan Freeman
 Maria Friedman
 Peter Friedman
 Jane Froman
 Penny Fuller

G

 June Gable
 Eva Gabor
 Josh Gad
 Boyd Gaines
 Davis Gaines
 Helen Gallagher
 John Gallagher, Jr.
 Peter Gallagher
 Jenn Gambatese
 Victor Garber
 Tess Gardella
 Judy Garland
 Betty Garrett
 Ana Gasteyer
 Dick Gautier
 William Gaxton
 Will Geer
 Drew Gehling
 Richard Gere
 Alexander Gemignani
 Stephen Geoffreys
 Malcolm Gets
 Tamara Geva
 Alice Ghostley
 Debbie Gibson
 Virginia Gibson
 Kathie Lee Gifford
 Jack Gilford
 Anita Gillette
 Hermione Gingold
 Lillian Gish
 Jackie Gleason
 Joanna Gleason
 Montego Glover
 Savion Glover
 Adam Godley
 Renée Elise Goldsberry
 Whoopi Goldberg
 Annie Golden
 Tony Goldwyn
 Eydie Gormé
 Louis Gossett Jr.
 Elliott Gould
 Robert Goulet
 Jason Graae
 Betty Grable
 Ilene Graff
 Randy Graff
 Todd Graff
 Lauren Graham
 Kelsey Grammer
 Ariana Grande
 Cary Grant
 Debbie Gravitte
 Dolores Gray
 Gilda Gray
 Tamyra Gray
 Kathryn Grayson
 Adolph Green
 Al Green
 Ellen Greene
 Julie Gregg
 Joel Grey
 David Alan Grier
 Andy Griffith
 Tammy Grimes
 Harry Groener
 Jonathan Groff
 Justin Guarini
 Robert Guillaume
 Laurence Guittard
 Jasmine Guy

H

 Larry Haines
 Jack Haley
 Juanita Hall
 Lena Hall
 Michael C. Hall
 George Hamilton
 Carol Haney
 Christopher Hanke
 Ben Harney
 Barbara Harris
 Julie Harris
 Neil Patrick Harris
 Richard Harris 
 Sam Harris
 Rex Harrison
 Jackee Harry 
 Melissa Hart
 Grace Hartman
 Paul Hartman
 David Hasselhoff
 June Havoc
 Jill Haworth
 Richard Haydn
 Bill Hayes
 Sean Hayes
 Lillian Hayman
 Heather Headley
 George Hearn
 Joey Heatherton
 Ray Heatherton
 Anna Held
 Florence Henderson
 Marilu Henner
 Doug Henning
 Erika Henningsen
 Joshua Henry
 Ruthie Henshall
 Shuler Hensley
 Grey Henson
 Katharine Hepburn
 Wilson Jermaine Heredia
 Eileen Herlie
 David Hibbard
 Edward Hibbert
 Catherine Hickland 
 Darryl Hickman
 Rodney Hicks
 Samantha Hill
 Megan Hilty
 Gregory Hines
 Maurice Hines
 Mimi Hines
 Douglas Hodge
 Christian Hoff
 Portland Hoffa
 Jackie Hoffman
 Hal Holbrook
 Ron Holgate
 Jennifer Holliday
 Judy Holliday
 Stanley Holloway
 Celeste Holm
 Libby Holman
 Robert Hooks
 Bob Hope
 Linda Hopkins
 DeWolf Hopper 
 Hedda Hopper 
 Lena Horne
 Dee Hoty
 Jayne Houdyshell
 Sally Ann Howes
 Jennifer Hudson
 Cady Huffman
 Rhetta Hughes
 Ron Husmann
 Betty Hutton
 Phyllis Hyman

I

 James Monroe Iglehart 
 George S. Irving
 Bill Irwin
 May Irwin
 Burl Ives
 Dana Ivey

J

 Paul Jabara
 Hugh Jackman
 Cheyenne Jackson
 Christopher Jackson
 Ernestine Jackson
Arielle Jacobs
 Scott Jacoby
 Brian d'Arcy James
 Nikki M. James
 Gregory Jbara
 Anne Jeffreys
 Daniel H. Jenkins
 Michael Jeter
 Glynis Johns
 Susan Johnson
 Van Johnson
 Bill Johnson
 Al Jolson
 Allan Jones 
 Rachel Bay Jones
 Davy Jones 
 Dean Jones
 Jasmine Cephas Jones
 Leilani Jones
 Shirley Jones
 Jeremy Jordan
Joseph
 Raúl Juliá
 Adam Jacobs

K

 Madeline Kahn
 Brad Kane
 Helen Kane
 Ramin Karimloo
 Andy Karl
 Maria Karnilova
 Patti Karr
 Kendra Kassebaum
 Kurt Kasznar
 Danny Kaye
 Judy Kaye
 Stubby Kaye
 Lainie Kazan
 Steve Kazee
 Isabel Keating
 Diane Keaton
 Lila Kedrova
 Howard Keel
 Ruby Keeler
 Andrew Keenan-Bolger
 Celia Keenan-Bolger
 Sally Kellerman 
 Mike Kellin
 Gene Kelly
 Laura Michelle Kelly
 Patsy Kelly
 Pert Kelton
 Lauren Kennedy
 Anna Kendrick
 Larry Kert
 Michael Kidd 
 Richard Kiley
 Randall Duk Kim
 Chad Kimball
 Charles Kimbrough
 Mabel King
 Caitlin Kinnunen
 Lisa Kirk
 Eartha Kitt
 Derek Klena
 Kevin Kline
 Jack Klugman
 Hildegard Knef
 Wayne Knight
 Ruth Kobart
 Nikos Kourkoulos
 Jane Krakowski
 Levi Kreis
Leslie Kritzer
 Marc Kudisch
 Judy Kuhn

L

 Patti LaBelle
 LaChanze
 Drew Lachey
 Bert Lahr
 Cleo Laine
 Christine Lakin
 Fernando Lamas
 Nathan Lane
 Harold Lang
 Angela Lansbury
 Leigh Ann Larkin
 John Larroquette
 Lisby Larson
 Dick Latessa
 Linda Lavin
 Carol Lawrence
 Gertrude Lawrence
 Sharon Lawrence
 Steve Lawrence
 Tamika Lawrence
 Twiggy Lawson
 Evelyn Laye
 Beth Leavel
 Baayork Lee
 Gavin Lee
 Gypsy Rose Lee
 Michele Lee
 Vivien Leigh
 Ute Lemper
 Lotte Lenya
 Hal Le Roy
 Telly Leung
 Sam Levene
 Caissie Levy
 Dawnn Lewis
 Jenifer Lewis
 Jerry Lewis 
 Marcia Lewis
 Norm Lewis
 Vicki Lewis
 Winnie Lightner
 Beatrice Lillie
 Hal Linden
 Robert Lindsay
 Mark Linn-Baker
 Luba Lisa
 John Lithgow
 Cleavon Little
 Danny Lockin 
 Avon Long
 Mario Lopez
 Priscilla Lopez
 Tilly Losch
 Taylor Louderman
 Dorothy Loudon
 Tina Louise
 Claire Luce
 Lorna Luft
 Rebecca Luker
 BarBara Luna
 Patti LuPone
 Robert LuPone
 Stephen Lynch

M

Ma–Mh

 Jeanette MacDonald
 Erin Mackey
 Shirley MacLaine
 Fred MacMurray
 Gordon MacRae
 Brandon Maggart
 Natalia Makarova
 Mako
 Victoria Mallory
 Terrence Mann
 Patricia Marand
 Lesli Margherita
 Julienne Marie
 Constantine Maroulis
 Bianca Marroquín
 Howard Marsh
 Rob Marshall
 Andrea Martin
 Mary Martin
 Millicent Martin
 Ross Martin
 Virginia Martin
 The Marx Brothers
 Kyle Dean Massey
 Mary Elizabeth Mastrantonio
 Jessie Matthews
 Matt Mattox
 Victor Mature 
 Alli Mauzey
 Jefferson Mays
 Marin Mazzie
 Andrea McArdle
 Chris McCarrell
 Isabelle McCalla
 Forrest McClendon
 Rob McClure 
 Myron McCormick
 Joan McCracken
 Audra McDonald
 Christopher McDonald
 Roddy McDowall
 Maureen McGovern
 Michael McGrath
 Frank McHugh
 Joey McIntyre 
 Donna McKechnie
 Lonette McKee
 Julia McKenzie
 Nina Mae McKinney
Elle McLemore
 John McMartin
 Barbara McNair
 Armelia McQueen
 Butterfly McQueen
 Kay Medford
 Eddie Mekka
 Idina Menzel
 Marian Mercer
 Melina Mercouri
 Una Merkel
 Ethel Merman
 Theresa Merritt
 Timothy Meyers
 Lin-Manuel Miranda

Mi–Mz

 Marilyn Michaels 
 Lea Michele
 Keith Michell
 Ray Middleton
 Bette Midler
 Ruthie Ann Miles
 Cristin Milioti
 Ann Miller
 Marilyn Miller
 Patina Miller
 Sienna Miller
 Florence Mills
 Greg Mills
 Hayley Mills 
 Stephanie Mills
 Liza Minnelli
 Carmen Miranda
 Lin-Manuel Miranda
 Brian Stokes Mitchell
 James Mitchell
 John Cameron Mitchell
 Thomas Mitchell
 Lauren Molina
 Debra Monk
 Paolo Montalban
 Ricardo Montalbán
 Liliane Montevecchi
 Ron Moody 
 Grace Moore
 Mary Tyler Moore 
 Maureen Moore
 Melba Moore
 Victor Moore
 Lisa Mordente
 Tony Mordente
 Rita Moreno
 Frank Morgan
 Helen Morgan
 Patricia Morison
 Anita Morris
 Garrett Morris 
 Matthew Morrison
 Robert Morse
 Joe Morton
 Sydney Morton
 Zero Mostel
 Jessie Mueller
 Megan Mullally
 Jules Munshin
Patti Murin
 Julia Murney
 Donna Murphy
 George Murphy
 Peg Murray
 Pamela Myers
 Timothy Myers

N

 Mildred Natwick
 James Naughton 
 Barry Nelson
 Gene Nelson
 Bebe Neuwirth
 Phyllis Newman
 Julie Newmar
 Patricia Neway
 Anthony Newley
 Sahr Ngaujah
 The Nicholas Brothers
 Denise Nickerson 
 Gertrude Niesen
 Marni Nixon
 Eva Noblezada
 Christiane Noll
 Brandy Norwood
 Jack Norworth
 Ivor Novello
 Carrie Nye
 Louis Nye
 Russell Nype

O

 Richard O'Brien
 Caroline O'Connor
 Donald O'Connor
 Aubrey O'Day 
 Rosie O'Donnell
 Kelli O'Hara
 Maureen O'Hara
 Paige O'Hara
 Denis O'Hare
 John O'Hurley
 Tessie O'Shea
 Michael O'Sullivan
 Jack Oakie
 Leslie Odom, Jr.
 Edna May Oliver 
 Karen Olivo
 Jerry Orbach
 Brad Oscar
 Laura Osnes

P

 Ken Page
 Patrick Page
 Elaine Paige
 Janis Paige
 Leland Palmer
 Hugh Panaro
 Ashley Park
 Joshua Park
 Nicole Parker
 Sarah Jessica Parker
 Hunter Parrish
 Estelle Parsons
 Adam Pascal
 Mandy Patinkin
Lauren Patten
 Alan Paul
 Michele Pawk
 Alice Pearce
 Mary Beth Peil
 Ann Pennington
 Anthony Perkins
 Osgood Perkins 
 Bernadette Peters
 Brock Peters
 Clarke Peters
 Lauri Peters
 Lenka Peterson
 Irra Petina
 Valarie Pettiford
 Molly Picon
 Walter Pidgeon
 David Hyde Pierce
 Bryce Pinkham
 Tonya Pinkins 
 Ezio Pinza
 Karine Plantadit
 Marc Platt
 Ben Platt
 Alice Playten
 Christopher Plummer
 Billy Porter
 Eleanor Powell
 Jane Powell
 Jenny Powers
 Josephine Premice
 Harve Presnell
 Robert Preston
 Gilbert Price
 Lonny Price
 Vincent Price
 Faith Prince
 Jonathan Pryce

Q

 Anna Quayle
 Mae Questel
 Anthony Quinn

R

 Charlotte Rae
 George Raft 
 Ron Raines
 John Raitt
 Tommy Rall
 Sheryl Lee Ralph
 Sara Ramirez
 Sally Rand
 Tony Randall
 Da’Vine Joy Randolph
 Andrew Rannells
 Anthony Rapp
 Reneé Rapp
 Phylicia Rashad
 Raven-Symone
 Martha Raye
 Usher Raymond
 Lee Roy Reams
 Vivian Reed
 Roger Rees
 Charles Nelson Reilly
 Kate Reinders
 Carl Reiner
 Ann Reinking
 Charles Repole
 Clive Revill
 Debbie Reynolds
 Kyle Riabko
 Ian Richardson
 Natasha Richardson 
 Ron Richardson
 Eden Riegel
 Molly Ringwald
 Alice Ripley
 Cyril Ritchard
 Thelma Ritter
 Chita Rivera
 Jerome Robbins
 Lyda Roberti
 Joan Roberts
 Tony Roberts
 Paul Robeson
 Bill Robinson
 Marcia Rodd
 Jai Rodriguez
 Krysta Rodriguez
 Kate Rockwell
 Elena Roger
 Anne Rogers
 Ginger Rogers
 Will Rogers
 Will Roland
 Esther Rolle
 Linda Ronstadt
 Mickey Rooney
 Dee Roscioli
 Anika Noni Rose
 George Rose
 Ted Ross
 Lillian Roth 
 Patricia Routledge
 Daphne Rubin-Vega
 John Rubinstein 
 Rita Rudner
 Frances Ruffelle
 Michael Rupert
 Lillian Russell
 Rosalind Russell
 Irene Ryan
 Peggy Ryan
 Roz Ryan

S

 Ernie Sabella
 George Salazar
 Lea Salonga
 Stark Sands
 Jimmy Savo
 Josefina Scaglione
 Jana Schneider
 Susan H. Schulman
 Peter Scolari
 Sherie Rene Scott
 Elizabeth Seal
 Harry Secombe
 Vivienne Segal
 Kyle Selig
 Janie Sell
 Coleen Sexton
 Shanice
 Dick Shawn
 Tony Sheldon
 Carole Shelley
 Hiram Sherman
 Brooke Shields
 Martin Short
 Richard B. Shull
 Ethel Shutta
 Christopher Sieber
 Cesare Siepi
 Phil Silvers
 Hal Skelly
 Emily Skinner
 Walter Slezak
 Mews Small
 Alexis Smith
 Queenie Smith
 Rex Smith
 Alexandra Socha
 Phillipa Soo
 Paul Sorvino
 Ann Sothern
 J. Robert Spencer
 Kenneth Spencer
 Brent Spiner
 Victor Spinetti
 Lewis J. Stadlen
 John Stamos
 Elizabeth Stanley
 Pat Stanley
 Jean Stapleton 
 Lucas Steele
 Tommy Steele
 Bobby Steggert
 Anthony Stephens
 Frances Sternhagen
 David Ogden Stiers 
 Emma Stone
 Leonard Stone
 Barbra Streisand
 Josh Strickland
 Elaine Stritch
 Ali Stroker
 Sally Struthers 
 Jo Sullivan
 Yma Sumac
 Pat Suzuki
 Inga Swenson
 Swen Swenson
 Will Swenson
 Paulo Szot

T

 Caren Lyn Tackett
 Jason Tam
 Eva Tanguay 
 John Tartaglia
 Lilyan Tashman 
 Rip Taylor
 Valerie Taylor
 Wesley Taylor
 Lara Teeter
 Fay Templeton
 Norma Terris
 Mary Testa
 Donna Theodore
 Lynne Thigpen
 Jennifer Laura Thompson
 Tracie Thoms
 Kenneth Tobey
 Chaim Topol
 Constance Towers
 Helen Traubel
 John Travolta
 Taylor Trensch
 Louise Troy
 Tom Tryon 
 Sophie Tucker
 Tommy Tune
 Aaron Tveit
 Judy Tyler

U

 Leslie Uggams
 Miyoshi Umeki
 Brandon Uranowitz
 Jenna Ushkowitz

V

 Brenda Vaccaro
 Rudy Vallee
 Bobby Van
 Vivian Vance
 Dick Van Dyke
 Lupe Vélez
 Benay Venuta
 Gwen Verdon
 Ben Vereen
 Willemijn Verkaik
 Virginia Vestoff
 Martin Vidnovic
 Max von Essen

W

 Chuck Wagner
 Benjamin Walker
 Fredi Walker
 Nancy Walker
 Shani Wallis 
 Ray Walston
 Charles Walters
 Adrienne Warren
 Lesley Ann Warren
 Gedde Watanabe
 Ken Watanabe
 Ethel Waters
 Dilys Watling
 Susan Watson
 David Wayne
 Clifton Webb
 Barrett Wilbert Weed
 Robert Weede
 Elisabeth Welch
 Raquel Welch
 Orson Welles
 Robert Westenberg
 Helen Westley
 Bert Wheeler
 Lillias White
 Richard White
 Sammy White
 Terri White
 Paxton Whitehead
 Mary Wickes
 Teal Wicks
 Lee Wilkof
 Bert Williams
 Vanessa Williams
 Michelle Williams
 Michelle Williams
 Nicol Williamson
 Walter Willison
 Chandra Wilson
 Dooley Wilson
 Patrick Wilson
 Trey Wilson
 Beatrice Winde
 Barbara Windsor
 Charles Winninger 
 Marissa Jaret Winokur
 Hattie Winston
 Edward Winter
 Norman Wisdom
 Ignatius Wolfington
 BD Wong
 Charles Wood
 Tom Wopat
 Jo Anne Worley
 Lauren Worsham
 Fay Wray
 Amra-Faye Wright
 Samuel E. Wright
 Gretchen Wyler
 Nick Wyman
 Patrice Wymore 
 Ed Wynn
 Keenan Wynn
 Jessica Keenan Wynn

Y

 Tony Yazbeck
 Rachel York
 John Lloyd Young
 Josh Young

Z

 Pia Zadora
 Jerry Zaks
 Remy Zaken
 Karen Ziemba
 Chip Zien
 Vera Zorina

See also

 List of people from New York City
 Lists of actors

 
Lists of theatre actors
Lists of singers
 
Manhattan-related lists
Theatre-related lists